Sir Joseph Hallsworth (2 December 1884 – 19 July 1974) was a British trade union leader.

Biography 
Born in Audenshaw, near Manchester, Hallsworth began working in 1902 as a clerk for the Amalgamated Union of Co-operative Employees. He soon became the union's assistant secretary, and also became active in the Labour Party, standing unsuccessfully for Stretford at the 1918 general election.  He became the union's secretary in 1916, then when this merged to form the National Union of Distributive and Allied Workers (NUDAW), he was appointed Secretary-General of the new organisation.

In 1926, Hallsworth was first elected to the General Council of the Trades Union Congress (TUC), and he served as President of the TUC in 1939. He served on a large number of bodies, including the International Labour Organization and the Central Price Regulation Committee during World War II, and as President of the International Federation of Commercial, Clerical, and Technical Employees.  In 1947, NUDAW merged to form the Union of Shop, Distributive and Allied Workers, and Hallsworth was its first Secretary-General, serving for two years.  He was knighted in 1946, and stood down from various government committees in 1947, although he joined the National Coal Board. On retirement, he served as Chairman of the North Western Electricity Board, standing down in 1955.

References

External links
Catalogue of Hallsworth's research papers, held at the Modern Records Centre, University of Warwick

1884 births
1974 deaths
Labour Party (UK) parliamentary candidates
General Secretaries of the Union of Shop, Distributive and Allied Workers
Members of the General Council of the Trades Union Congress
National Union of Distributive and Allied Workers
People from Audenshaw
Presidents of the Trades Union Congress
Knights Bachelor